Elisabeth of Denmark (14 October 1524 – 15 October 1586) was Danish princess and a Duchess of Mecklenburg-Schwerin and later of Mecklenburg-Güstrow through marriage. She was the elder daughter of King Frederick I of Denmark and his second spouse Sophie of Pomerania.

Biography
Elizabeth was raised at the royal Danish court of her half brother and described as an extraordinary beauty. In 1542 she was engaged, and on 26 August 1543 Elizabeth was married to Duke Magnus III of Mecklenburg-Schwerin (4 July 1509 – 28 January 1550). This marriage was childless. She returned to Denmark in 1551 and stayed there until her second marriage in 1556.

Secondly, she married on 14 February 1556 Duke Ulrich III of Mecklenburg-Güstrow and had the only daughter Sophie, who married King Frederick II of Denmark in 1572. Her relationship to Ulrich is described as a happy one.
 
Elizabeth made frequent visits to the Danish royal court, and also to her former sister in law queen dowager Dorothea. After her daughter became Queen of Denmark in 1572, her visits to Denmark became longer. She is described as kind, sensible, religious and practical. She was also active in Mecklenburg-Güstrow: she reconstructed the churches in Güstrow and Doberan and protected hospitals and convents. She died on return from one of her visits to Denmark.

Legacy
Elizabeth's granddaughter Anne of Denmark married King James I of England. Thus every British monarch since has been her direct descendant, the present King Charles III being king of 15 independent nations.

Ancestry

References
  Article in the Dansk biografisk Lexikon

Literature 
 Elisabeth, Hertuginde av Meklenborg. In: Dansk biografisk leksikon. Vol. 4, pp. 497f. (digitalised)
 

1524 births
1586 deaths
16th-century Danish people
16th-century Danish women
Danish princesses
Duchesses of Mecklenburg-Schwerin
Norwegian princesses
House of Oldenburg in Denmark
House of Mecklenburg-Schwerin
Daughters of kings